Andrew Samuel McManus (October 22, 1911 — July 1, 1976) was an Irish-born Canadian former professional ice hockey player who played 26 games in the National Hockey League with the Montreal Maroons and the Boston Bruins between 1934 and 1936. The rest of his career, which lasted from 1934 to 1947, was spent in various minor and senior leagues. In 1935, McManus helped the Maroons win the Stanley Cup. McManus was born Belfast, Ireland, United Kingdom and raised in Toronto, Ontario.

Career statistics

Regular season and playoffs

External links

1911 births
1976 deaths
Boston Bruins players
Canadian ice hockey left wingers
Hershey Bears players
Irish emigrants to Canada (before 1923)
Kansas City Americans players
Montreal Maroons players
New Haven Eagles players
Philadelphia Ramblers players
Pittsburgh Hornets players
Place of death missing
Providence Reds players
St. Louis Flyers (AHA) players
Sportspeople from Belfast
Ice hockey people from Toronto
Stanley Cup champions
Washington Lions players
Windsor Bulldogs (1929–1936) players